Casey, Crime Photographer, known by a variety of titles on radio (aka Crime Photographer, Flashgun Casey, Casey, Press Photographer) was a media franchise from the 1930s to the 1960s. The character was the creation of novelist George Harmon Coxe. Casey was featured in the pulp magazine, Black Mask, novels, comic books, radio, film, television and legitimate theatre.

Jack "Flashgun" Casey, was a crime photographer for the newspaper The Morning Express.  With the help of reporter Ann Williams, he solved crimes and recounted his stories to Ethelbert the bartender (portrayed by John Gibson) and other friends at the Blue Note, their favorite tavern and jazz club where the Archie Bleyer Orchestra and the Teddy Wilson Trio were featured. The role of Ann Williams was portrayed throughout most of the run of the series (as well as the Casey, Crime Photographer television series) by Jan Miner, perhaps best remembered as "Madge" the manicurist on Palmolive's television soap commercials from the 1960s and 1970s.

Radio
Begun as over 20 popular short stories in Black Mask, there were films and  novels before the stories were brought to radio under various names. The series aired on CBS. The radio show was sustained by the network when a sponsor could not be found. Sponsors of the show include Anchor Hocking, Toni home permanents, Toni Shampoo and Philip Morris.

Cast 
Matt Crowley, Casey
Jim Backus, Casey (briefly )
Staats Cotsworth, Casey
Jan Miner, Ann Williams
Lesley Woods, Ann Williams
John Gibson, Ethelbert the bartender
Tony Marvin, announcer

Air dates
 07/07/43 – 04/01/44 (as Flashgun Casey)
 04/08/44 – 06/26/45 (as Casey, Press Photographer)
 07/11/45 – 03/13/47 (as Crime Photographer)
 03/20/47 – 11/16/50 (as Casey, Crime Photographer)
 01/13/54 – 04/22/55 (as Crime Photographer)
In the period between the fourth and fifth series, the live television version was telecast.

Other media

 "Flashgun" Casey was featured in  21 short stories in Black Mask, a popular pulp magazine of the time. Collections of these stories were published in anthology form as well. Coxe wrote five novels featuring Casey from the 1930s to the 1960s. Two films Women Are Trouble and Here's Flash Casey were produced in the 1930s. Timely Comics published four issues of a comic book tie-in to the radio show in 1949, with art by Vernon Henkel.

Television

In 1951 the popular series moved to television:
 First Telecast: April 19, 1951
 Last Telecast: June 5, 1952
 Casey (April–June 1951): Richard Carlyle
 Casey (June 1951 – April 1952): Darren McGavin
 Ann Williams: Jan Miner (reprising her radio role)

McGavin commented, "The cast of Crime Photographer didn’t go down fighting. They took off for the hills. It was so bad that it was never re-run, and that's saying something when you recall the caliber of television programs in those days."

References

External links
The Definitive: Casey, Crime Photographer article and log

1940s American radio programs
1950s American radio programs
American radio dramas
CBS Radio programs